μ Gruis, Latinised as, Mu Gruis refers to 2 distinct star systems in the constellation Grus:

 μ1 Gruis
 μ2 Gruis

Grus (constellation)
Gruis, Mu